Moleropterix is an extinct genus of small primitive metallic moths within the family Micropterigidae, containing one species, Moleropterix kalbei. It is described from a well-preserved forewing of the Fur Formation of the earliest Eocene (Early Ypresian) of Denmark.

References

†
Fossil Lepidoptera
Eocene insects
Fossils of Denmark
†
Fur Formation